The 1932 Currie Cup was the 17th edition of the Currie Cup, the premier domestic rugby union competition in South Africa.

See also

 Currie Cup

References

1932
1932 in South African rugby union
Currie